John Barry (July 16, 1799 – November 19, 1859) was an Irish-born prelate of the Roman Catholic Church. He served as the second bishop of the Diocese of Savannah, covering the state of Georgia, from 1857 to 1859.

Biography

Early life 
John Barry was born on July 16, 1799, in Oylegate, County Wexford, in Ireland to Sylvester and Mary (Donohue) Barry.  While still a seminarian in Ireland, Barry was recruited to immigrate to the United States and finish his theology studies in the Diocese of Charleston. 

Barry was ordained to the priesthood in Charleston by Bishop John England for the Diocese of Charleston on September 24, 1825. Barry was then sent to Georgia (then part of the diocese), where he served as pastor of Holy Trinity Parish in Augusta from 1830 to 1854. During the cholera epidemic of 1832, Barry converted his house in Augusta into a hospital.  When the epidemic was over, it became an orphanage. He was appointed vicar general and superior of the seminary in 1844. 

When the Diocese of Savannah was erected in 1850, Barry was incardinated, or transferred, there from the Diocese of Charleston.  He was named vicar general of the Diocese of Savannah in 1853.

Bishop of Savannah 
On January 9, 1857, Barry was appointed to succeed Bishop Francis Gartland as bishop of the Diocese of Savannah by Pope Pius IX. He received his episcopal consecration on August 2, 1857, at the Cathedral of the Assumption of the Blessed Virgin Mary in Baltimore, Maryland from Archbishop Francis Kenrick, with Bishops Michael Portier and John Neumann serving as co-consecrators. 

In July 1859, Barry traveled to France for medical treatment.  John Barry died on November 19, 1859, in Paris at the convent of the Brothers Hospitallers of St. John of God. His remains were returned to Augusta, where he was buried at the Church of the Holy Trinity.

See also

 Catholic Church hierarchy
 Catholic Church in the United States
 Historical list of the Catholic bishops of the United States
 List of Catholic bishops of the United States
 Lists of patriarchs, archbishops, and bishops

References

External links
Roman Catholic Diocese of Savannah

Episcopal succession

1799 births
1859 deaths
Christian clergy from County Wexford
19th-century Irish Roman Catholic priests
Roman Catholic Diocese of Charleston
19th-century Roman Catholic bishops in the United States
Irish emigrants to the United States (before 1923)
Roman Catholic bishops of Savannah, Georgia